Nuzha is an area in Kuwait City; it is located in Al Asimah Governorate in Kuwait. Its population in 2011 was 8,372.

Embassies in Nuzha

Embassies in Kuwait
  Brazil
  Czech Republic
  Tanzania

References

Suburbs of Kuwait City
Populated places in Kuwait